Sport Club Corinthians Paulista, commonly known as Corinthians, is a professional women's association football club based in São Paulo, Brazil. Founded in 1997, the team is affiliated with Federação Paulista de Futebol and play their home games at Estádio Parque São Jorge. The team colors, reflected in their logo and uniform, are white and black. They play in the top tier of women's football in Brazil, the Campeonato Brasileiro de Futebol Feminino, and in the Campeonato Paulista de Futebol Feminino, the first division of the traditional in-state competition.

History

First spell
In 1994 Corinthians co-opted a promotional futsal team of teenaged models run by the Flash Book modeling agency and featuring a 15-year-old Milene Domingues to be their club women's team.

The Brazilian Football Confederation (CBF) successfully encouraged Corinthians and its other leading clubs to form female teams after the national women's team's performance exceeded expectations at the 1996 Olympics. After an unassuming 11 years, Corinthians' women's team was scrapped ahead of the 2009 season. The unhappy players were threatening to sue the management, as the only player with a legitimate contract was Cristiane Rozeira, whose salary had been paid by a local hospital.

Corinthians/Audax era
In 2015 Corinthians decided to return to women's football and agreed a partnership with Grêmio Osasco Audax Esporte Clube, whose women's section had debuted in the 2015 Campeonato Paulista. The collaboration was confirmed in early 2016. A draft in February 2016 assigned Brazil women's national football team players Letícia and Rafinha to the combined Corinthians Audax team, who went on to win the 2016 Copa do Brasil de Futebol Feminino.

Corinthians Audax won the 2017 Copa Libertadores Femenina by beating Colo-Colo of Chile on a penalty shootout. Shortly thereafter Corinthians announced that they were withdrawing from the agreement with Audax and would enter the Campeonato Brasileiro de Futebol Feminino themselves. A change in CONMEBOL rules meant that from 2019 clubs wishing to participate in continental competitions had to run their own women's teams.

Second spell: the formation of a dynasty
The sole Corinthians team created a dynasty: extended their total of Copa Libertadores Femenina to three (2017, 2019, 2021), won four national championships in six finals (2018, 2020, 2021, 2022), as well as a three-peat Campeonato Paulista (2019, 2020, 2021) and the inaugural Supercopa do Brasil Feminina in 2022.

Players

Current roster

Out on loan

Former players
For details of current and former players, see :Category:Sport Club Corinthians Paulista (women) players.

Staff

Current technical staff

Honours
 Copa Libertadores Femenina
 Winners (3): 2017, 2019, 2021
 Campeonato Brasileiro
 Winners (4): 2018, 2020, 2021, 2022
 Copa do Brasil
 Winners (1): 2016
 Supercopa do Brasil Feminina
 Winners (2): 2022, 2023
 Campeonato Paulista
 Winners (1): 2019, 2020, 2021
 Copa Paulista
 Winners (1): 2022

See also

 Corinthians
 Corinthians (futsal)
 Corinthians (beach soccer)
 Corinthians (basketball)
 Corinthians Steamrollers (American football)
 Corinthians (rugby)

References

External links
  
 Corinthians at thefinalball.com 

Association football clubs established in 1997
Women's football clubs in Brazil
1997 establishments in Brazil
women